The Suriname women's national U-20 football team is the national women's football team of Suriname and is overseen by the Surinaamse Voetbal Bond and its represents Suriname in international women's under 20 or youth women's football competitions.

Players
 The following players were called up for 2022 CONCACAF Women's U-20 Championship.

Fixtures and results
Legend

2021

2022

Competitive records

FIFA U-20 Women's World Cup

CONCACAF Women's U-20 Championship

References

women
South American women's national association football teams
Caribbean women's national association football teams
Women's sport in Suriname